Bidfood (formerly known as 3663, Bidvest 3663 and Bidvest Foodservice) is a Foodservice Wholesaler and distributor based in the United Kingdom.

The BFS Group Limited was a wholly owned subsidiary of Bidvest, an international services, trading and distribution company listed on the JSE Securities Exchange in South Africa. It is now a wholly owned subsidiary of BidCorp, also listed on the JSE. BidCorp, the Bid Corporation Limited, is the holding company of the Bidvest Group Limited.

History

BFS Group, trading as Booker Foodservice, was originally owned by Booker Group, having been formed through a series of acquisitions and mergers.  In May 1999 Booker sold the company to Bidvest Group, in November of that year the company was re-branded as 3663, with the slogan "First for foodservice".  The name "3663" spells "food" on a telephone keypad and is pronounced "three double-six three".

In 2003 BFS Group acquired Swithenbank, a fruit and vegetable supplier based in Bradford, and Wilson Watson, a catering equipment supplier which was subsequently rebranded as 3663 Catering Equipment.

In 2009 the company acquired Giffords Fine Foods.

In 2010 the operations of the company were separated into two distinct divisions, 3663 and Bidvest Logistics.

In 2011 the 3663 brand was re-branded with a new logo, vehicle livery and slogan, "inspired by you".  In June of that year Inverness Farmers, a local wholesaler in the Highlands of Scotland which had started as a milk supplier, was acquired.

In July 2012 BFS Group acquired Oban-based wholesaler Forteith Foodservice, a family run partnership which operated in the Argyll area.  In October South Lincs Foodservice, a wholesaler operating in Lincolnshire, was fully acquired, after purchasing a minority holding earlier in the year.
In September 2012 the acquired businesses of Giffords Fine Foods and Swithenbank were merged to form Swithenbank Fresh & Fine Foods, to operate as a single fresh produce division within 3663.

In February 2014 3663 was re-branded as Bidvest 3663.

In July 2015 Bidvest 3663 was re-branded as Bidvest Foodservice, meaning the "3663" name ceased to be used in any branding by the company after more than 15 years of use.

On 16 February 2016, Bidvest Foodservice announced it would change its name to Bidfood. The change follows the separation of the global Bidvest Foodservice businesses from the Bidvest Group, when it listed independently on the Johannesburg Stock Exchange in May last year. The change took effect from 3 April 2017.

The listing meant that Bidvest Foodservice UK, along with the other Bidvest Foodservice businesses around the world, have all changed their name to Bidfood reflect this.

Operations

Bidvest Foodservice
The Bidvest Foodservice division of the company operates as a foodservice wholesaler supplying fresh, frozen, ambient and non-food products to customers in a wide range of sectors within the foodservice and catering industry; including local authorities, NHS trusts, defence contractors, hotel and restaurant chains as well as many independent operators in the hospitality industry.
Bidvest Foodservice operates a fleet of around 850 temperature-controlled delivery vehicles, delivering fresh, chilled, and frozen goods out of 23 depots, and 4 regional distribution centres across the United Kingdom. It has 5 major offices across the country.

Bidvest Logistics
Bidvest Logistics provides distribution and supply chain services to larger operators in the foodservice industry, including many well-known restaurant and fast-food brands.

Gallery

References

External links

Official website

Logistics companies of the United Kingdom
Catering and food service companies of the United Kingdom